Wilson R. Herron was a member of the Wisconsin State Assembly.

Biography
Herron was born on November 8, 1830, reports have differed on the location. He died on August 12, 1895.

Career
Herron was a member of the Assembly during the 1874 and 1877 sessions. Additionally, he was Postmaster and Chairman of the Board of Supervisors of Sharon, Walworth County, Wisconsin. He was a Republican.

References

External links

The Political Graveyard

People from Sharon, Wisconsin
Republican Party members of the Wisconsin State Assembly
Wisconsin postmasters
1830 births
1895 deaths
Burials in Wisconsin
19th-century American politicians
County supervisors in Wisconsin